Tauã Antunes (born 24 February 1995), simply known as Tauã, is a Brazilian footballer who plays as a midfielder for Portuguesa.

Club career
Born in Caraguatatuba, São Paulo, Tauã was a São José dos Campos FC youth graduate. He made his senior debut with Lemense in the 2016 Campeonato Paulista Segunda Divisão, and moved to EC São Bernardo in the following year.

After helping in São Bernardo's promotion to the Campeonato Paulista Série A3, Tauã joined São José-SP for the 2018 Segundona. On 10 January 2019, he was presented at Comercial-SP.

On 11 November 2019, Tauã agreed to a contract with Portuguesa Santista. The following 13 August, he moved to Série C side Boa Esporte.

On 15 January 2021, Tauã was announced at Água Santa. On 15 June, he signed for Portuguesa, and lifted the Campeonato Paulista Série A2 with the latter in 2022.

Career statistics

Honours
Portuguesa
Campeonato Paulista Série A2: 2022

References

1995 births
Living people
Footballers from São Paulo (state)
Brazilian footballers
Association football midfielders
Campeonato Brasileiro Série C players
Campeonato Brasileiro Série D players
Clube Atlético Lemense players
Clube Atlético Joseense players
São José Esporte Clube players
Comercial Futebol Clube (Ribeirão Preto) players
Associação Atlética Portuguesa (Santos) players
Boa Esporte Clube players
Esporte Clube Água Santa players
Esporte Clube XV de Novembro (Piracicaba) players
Associação Portuguesa de Desportos players